Breiwick is a village on the island of Mainland in Shetland, Scotland. The remains of a broch are located above Corbie Geo at Hawks Ness, near to the settlement. Wildlife in the area includes the knot.

References

External links

Canmore - Louise Charlotte: Brei Wick, North Sea site record

Villages in Mainland, Shetland